Dean Capobianco (born 11 May 1970) is a former Australian athlete, known best as a sprinter. He won the 1990 Stawell Gift and represented Australia in the 200 metres at the 1992 Barcelona and 1996 Atlanta Olympic Games.

Athletics
In 1993, he reached his peak in the World Athletics Championships in Stuttgart, Germany, when he set a new personal best of 20.18 seconds over 200 metres.

Controversy
An IAAF arbitration panel found Capobianco guilty of taking anabolic steroids, 10 months after he was cleared of any doping offence in a preliminary hearing by an IAAF independent arbitrator. IAAF general secretary Istvan Gyulai said that the reinstatement of Capobianco in July 1996 following a report for Athletics Australia by Robert Ellicott, QC, was a mistake. That inquiry cleared Capobianco on a technicality to run in the Olympic Games. In 1996, after months of legal challenge,  Capobianco was banned from competition for four years by the IAAF for taking the banned steroid stanozolol after a meeting in Hengelo.
Capobianco raced in Dijon the day prior to Hengelo and returned a negative (clear) drugs test. Capobianco's costs for arbitration were paid by the IAAF and his ban was later reduced to 2 years.

Results

World Athletics Championships

Olympics

External links
 Profile

References

1970 births
Living people
Australian male sprinters
Olympic athletes of Australia
Athletes (track and field) at the 1992 Summer Olympics
Athletes (track and field) at the 1996 Summer Olympics
Stawell Gift winners
Australian sportspeople in doping cases
Doping cases in athletics
Western Australian Sports Star of the Year winners
Athletes from Perth, Western Australia
Doping cases in Australian track and field